Törmä  is a village in the municipality of Keminmaa in Lapland in north-western Finland.

Villages in Finland
Keminmaa